Bahgat may refer to:

People with the surname
Gawdat Bahgat (born 1960s), Egyptian-born American political scientist
Helmy Bahgat Badawi (1904-1957), Egyptian politician
Hossam Bahgat (born c. 1978), Egyptian human rights activist and investigative journalist
Soraya Bahgat, Finnish-Egyptian women's rights advocate

People with the forename
Bahgat Osman (1931-2001), Egyptian cartoonist
Bahgat G. Sammakia, Egyptian-born American mechanical engineer

Other
Bahgat Group, Egyptian company